Helen Taylor Johannesen (August 24, 1915—October 5, 1950) was an American composer.

Biography 
Helen Taylor, who died tragically in 1950, was a gifted and promising Juilliard-trained composer and the wife of pianist Grant Johannesen. 

Taylor grew up in Salt Lake City. She studied piano at the McCune School of Music. She received her BM from the University of Utah in 1937, her MM from Columbia Teachers College in 1941, and her degree in composition from Juilliard in 1945, where she completed a three-movement symphony. She worked at the Martha Graham Dance Company as a composition pianist and worked with Aaron Copland on "Appalachian Spring." In this role, she honed her skills as an improviser. In 1948, her violin sonata was recognized with a National Association of Composers and Conductors Award.

She was killed in an auto collision.

Helen Taylor Johannesen Scholarship 
Taylor's sister, Beverly Sorensen, established the Helen Taylor Johannesen Memorial Endowed Scholarship at Brigham Young University. The scholarship supports a music composition major by paying for their tuition and lesson fees.

Recordings 
In 2001 and 2007, pianist Grant Johannesen recorded his wife's music in two albums: "Discovering Helen Taylor" and "Discovering Helen Taylor 2." They include recordings of Taylor's Symphony, piano music, and chamber music.

References

External links 
 Utah International Music Academy & Helen Taylor Johannesen Piano Competition, University of Utah.

Juilliard School alumni
1916 births
1950 deaths
American composers
University of Utah alumni
Teachers College, Columbia University alumni
Martha Graham